Michael Daly may refer to:

Sportspeople
 Michael Daly (soccer) (born 1987), American soccer player
 Mike Daly (American football), American football coach
 Mike Daly (Canadian football) (born 1990), Canadian football defensive back

Others
 Michael J. Daly (1924–2008), United States Army officer and Medal of Honor recipient
 Michael Daly (journalist), author and special contributor to The Daily Beast
 Mike Daly, producer, songwriter and multi-instrumentalist
 Michael Daly, a character in the film 360
 Michael Christopher Daly (born 1953), geologist

See also
 Mike Dailly (disambiguation)
 Michael Daly Hawkins (born 1954), judge on the United States Court of Appeals for the Ninth Circuit
 Michael Daley (disambiguation)